The Aerauto PL.5C was a roadable aircraft developed in Italy in the early 1950s. It was a high-wing two-seat monoplane whose wings could be folded to quickly transform it into an automobile. It was different from many such projects in that it used its pusher propeller (powered by a Continental C85) for propulsion not only in the air, but on the road as well. Development was abandoned in 1953.

Designed by aircraft engineer Luigi Pellarini, the Aerauto was built by Carrozzeria Colli in Milan.

Specifications (PL.5C)

References

Citations

Bibliography

1950s Italian civil utility aircraft
Roadable aircraft
Aircraft manufactured in Italy
Single-engined pusher aircraft
Aircraft first flown in 1949
High-wing aircraft